The Sinking of the Ships of the Black Sea Fleet in the Tsemes Bay occurred on June 18, 1918 near Novorossiysk. According to the agreements, the Soviet Government was supposed to transfer its Black Sea Fleet to Germany, but did not want to do this. Acting commander of the Black Sea Fleet, Captain 1st Rank Tikhmenev received an official order to bring the ships of the fleet from Novorossiysk to Sevastopol, where they would be handed over to German troops. He also received a secret order to drown them in the Novorossiysk bay. Tikhmenev, after long deliberation and discussion with the naval committees, ordered all ships to go to Sevastopol. The crews of many ships refused to do this and scuttled them.

Background

The Black Sea Fleet is not mentioned in the articles of the Brest Peace Treaty. However, in April 1918, after the coup and liquidation of the Central Rada of the Ukrainian People's Republic, the Germans invaded Crimea together with the troops of Hetman Pavel Skoropadsky, who proclaimed the "Ukrainian State", and himself – "All–Ukrainian Hetman". This posed a clear threat to the fleet in Sevastopol. Vice–Admiral Sablin was removed from command of the fleet, but when the Germans appeared near the city and the panic began, the crew committees of the battleships "Volya" and "Free Russia" asked him to take command back. On April 29, Sablin, who demanded expanded powers for himself, ordered the flags of the "Ukrainian State" to be raised on the ships. The crews of many destroyers refused to do this, and Sablin ordered them to leave the bay before the end of the day. Most of the destroyers left for Novorossiysk. Since the delegation on behalf of the "Ukrainian Fleet" was received by the Germans very coldly, and their troops appeared on the northern coast of the bay, on the evening of April 30, Sablin ordered all the ships remaining on the move, led by battleships, to leave Sevastopol. Pulling off, the destroyer "Wrathful" by mistake of the engine room ran aground and could not leave. During the exit from the bay "Svobodnaya Rossiya" was fired upon by the Germans from the guns installed on the shore and received minor damage. Rear Admiral Ostrogradsky was instructed to prepare for the destruction of ships incapable of crossing. Because of the panic in the port, only the "Zavetny" destroyer was destroyed.

Events in Novorossiysk
On the morning of May 1, rebel destroyers arrived at Novorossiysk, and in the evening – a fleet with battleships. The city was formally under the control of the Kuban–Black Sea Soviet Republic, but the rule of law was violated by transports that had come earlier from other Black Sea ports, including those with the Red Army. Order was restored when naval guards took control of the city. Sablin, who received power from the sailors of battleships and was sabotaged in Sevastopol by the crews of most of the destroyers, demanded a general vote of the teams on his candidacy. The teams voted for his leadership. Sablin received a telegram from Field Marshal Eichhorn from Kiev demanding that the ships be returned to Sevastopol, where they should be handed over to the Germans. German reconnaissance aircraft began to appear over Novorossiysk, and their submarines at sea. The city was anxiously awaiting the further advance of the Germans, who had already occupied Rostov and Kerch. The Commander of the Army Avtonomov arrived in Novorossiysk, promising to mobilize 20 thousand people for defense on land. Soon he was recalled to Moscow. Avilov, appointed commissar of the fleet, arrived in the city, but Sablin managed to minimize his influence. The ships did not have enough fuel for another sea voyage. Several echelons of oil products were obtained from Tsaritsyn.

In early June, the navy sailor Ivan Vakhrameev arrived from the capital with a package of secret documents. In them, the naval headquarters described the prospects for the advance of the Germans to the fleet, and they ended with Trotsky's resolution to immediately sink the ships. The resolution made a depressing impression on the command of the fleet. Sablin left for Moscow with the intentions to achieve the cancellation of the order and the restoration of supplies, leaving the commander of the commander of the "Volya" Captain 1st Rank Tikhmenev. On June 8, Tikhmenev and other senior officers sent a telegram to the government asking them to withdraw the resolution and wait for further developments. On June 10, the fleet received a number of telegrams from the government, including one encrypted. They said that during the Kiev negotiations, the Germans delivered an ultimatum to return the ships to Sevastopol before June 19, otherwise they would continue their offensive deep into Russia. An open telegram ordered the fleet to be withdrawn to Sevastopol and surrendered to the Germans, while a coded one demanded that they be sunk. Tikhmenev revealed to the crews the contents of the telegrams and opposite orders, and the next days passed in general discussion of the further fate of the ships. The rumor that the Germans were landing a 20,000–strong corps in Taman demoralized the fleet: desertion and continuous rallies began. A delegation from the Kuban–Black Sea Republic arrived, asking to unite and not to carry out the orders of the capital. The delegation promised to discuss the issue of allocating ground units for the defense of the city in the capital of the republic, where it left and did not appear again.

Tikhmenev hoped that the teams, as at the end of April with Sablin, would come to ask him to take full command, and therefore almost did not appear at numerous meetings. On June 14, he issued an order to the teams to vote for one of two options: go to Sevastopol or sink the ships. Tikhmenev did not offer the option to stay awaiting further developments or to fight, but about 1,000 sailors voted this way. 900 voted for Sevastopol, 450 for flooding. On June 15, the commander announced that the referendum was in favor of Sevastopol, discarding the votes of those who chose "wait or fight" as evaders. Although most of the officers supported him, the smaller, led by the commander of the destroyer "Kerch" Senior Lieutenant Kukel, considered the surrender of the ships to the Germans the highest shame, and began to agitate for the sinking. They assessed the results of the vote as "majority against surrender". On April 15, the teams, in view of the impending destruction of the fleet, received a salary for 5 months in advance and pensions, and in the evening Tikhmenev ordered to begin preparations for sailing. The teams of some destroyers, in particular the Ushakovsky Division, ignored the order, others began to prepare, but continued to doubt the decision. Many opponents of the campaign left the ships at night.

On the morning of June 16, it was ordered to separate the couples, which many destroyers did not do. Having learned about the decision to go to Sevastopol, the townspeople flooded the port and breakwaters, urging the teams to stay. The crews of many ships after desertion were reduced many times, simultaneously with the demonstrations, attempts to loot on these ships began. In order to cut off contacts with the demonstrators, several destroyers sailed to the inner raid to the "Volya". The water area was filled with small vessels, on which the protesters approached the ships and persuaded the crew to change their decision. Such delegations were not allowed on the "Volya", but the engine crew of the "Free Russia", which continued to load, succumbed to agitation and refused to work, which paralyzed the ship. At one o'clock in the afternoon, Tikhmenev ordered all ships to go to the outer roadstead; "Volya" was followed by the "Hasty", "Restless", "Daring", "Zhivoy" destroyers, "Zharkiy" towed by "Zhivoy" (whose crew scattered), the "Troyan" auxiliary cruiser, and later "Pylky". Soon the main representatives of the Soviet government, Avilov and Vakhrameev, arrived on the "Volya", but could not convince Tikhmenev to sink the ships. The latter scheduled a departure at 10 pm, trying to take away also "Free Russia". Attempts to replace her machine crew with officers and civilian craftsmen have failed. The destroyer "Loud", which left for the raid in the evening, was not going to join the departing ones, but was soon flooded by its small crew. At night, Tikhmenev's formation – "Volya", destroyers "Daring", "Hasty", "Restless", "Pylky", "Zhivoy", "Hot" in tow at the auxiliary cruiser "Troyan" and the floating base of high–speed boats "Cross" – left to Sevastopol.

Flooding

By the morning of June 18, a full crew remained on "Kerch" (about 130 people), on "Lieutenant Shestakov" up to fifty sailors from different ships were assembled, on the rest of the destroyers – less than 10 people on each. "Fidonisi" was completely abandoned by the crew, the destroyer officers left by boat to Kerch. Also, all the crews of boats, port tugs and naval transports, which were also going to sink, fled: the transports of the Black Sea Fleet were mostly foreign steamers that ended up in Russian ports of the Black Sea at the beginning of the First World War. It was decided to use "Lieutenant Shestakov" as a tug and "Kerch" as a torpedo bomber. In the morning, a high–ranking employee of the People's Commissar Raskolnikov arrived at the port to supervise the flooding. He promptly took action to sink the ships on the same day.

To the surprise of Kukel, the commander of the "Free Russia", whose crew fled, Captain 1st Rank Terentyev left the ship, refusing to direct the sinking of the ship. Raskolnikov managed to recruit a crew for the steamer, which took the battleship in tow. By 4 o'clock in the afternoon all the ships for sinking, having raised the signal "I die, but I do not surrender!", were taken out to the outer roadstead. "Kerch" sank "Fidonisi" with a torpedo, after which, within 35 minutes, all other ships were sunk by opening the Kingston valves and undermining key mechanisms. The sinking of all ships in a short time was caused by the desire not to surrender the ships to the Germans. Approaching the "Free Russia", "Kerch" fired several torpedoes to sink the battleship. The speedboats were not flooded as they could be transported by rail to other basins. In Novorossiysk itself, where the "Kerch" team had a bad reputation after the drowning of the officers of the Varnavinsky Regiment six months earlier, Kukel did not drown the destroyer, but ordered it to go to Tuapse. On the morning of April 19, the team sank their ship there and boarded the train.

Sunken ships

Aftermath

The fleet that left for Sevastopol was transferred to the control of the German fleet. Most of the ships remained there until the defeat of Germany in the First World War, after which they came under the control of the Allies. They handed them over to the White Army, and many ships returned to Novorossiysk, and later became part of the Russian Squadron.

The White movement was joined by Tikhmenev and Sablin, who, after arriving in Moscow, was arrested and fled. Raskolnikov, Kukel and Avilov, who led the flooding, became prominent Bolshevik leaders of the Soviet state, and in the late 1930s they were repressed.

In the 1920s, the rise of ships sunk in the Tsemes Bay began, some of them were restored, for example, the destroyer «Kaliakria» (Dzerzhinsky). By the beginning of the 21st century, only «Svobodnaya Rossiya» and «Gromkiy» remained unaffected.

Monument
In 1980, at the 12th kilometer of the Sukhum Highway of Novorossiysk, the monument to the sailors of the revolution "I die, but I do not surrender!" was unveiled by the sculptor Tsigal and architects Belopolsky, Kananin and Khavin. On the far side of the road from the sea rises a 12–meter granite monument of the kneeling sailor. On the side of the sea there is a cube with a thank you text and a flag signal "I die, but I do not surrender!" inside, as well as signs of ships with the direction and distance to the places of their sinking with an accuracy of a hundredth of a mile.

References

Sources
Harald Graf. On «Novik». Baltic Fleet in War and Revolution / Preface and Comments by Vladimir Gribovsky – Saint Petersburg: Publishing House "Gangut", 1997 – 488 Pages With Illustrations. . Circulation: 5300 Copies // 2nd Edition. Reprinted From the Edition: Harald Graf. On «Novik». R. Oldenburg Printing House, Munich, 1922

Civil War in Russia: Black Sea Fleet / Compiled by Vitaly Dotsenko – Moscow: Limited Liability Company "ACT Publishing House", 2002 – 544 Pages: 16 Sheets of Illustrations – (Military History Library). . Circulation 5100 Copies // Vladimir Kukel. The Truth About the Death of the Black Sea Fleet on June 18, 1918 – Leningrad: 1923

External links
Alexander Puchenkov: The Novorossiysk Tragedy of the Black Sea Fleet: 1918. Regnum
Legitimists, Lenin Gave the Order! The Tragedy of the Sinking of a Squadron of the Black Sea Fleet in Tsemes Bay Today Marks 95 Years. Novorossiysk News

Russian Empire in World War I
June 1918 events
Conflicts in 1918